Vojtech Alexander (Slovak), Alexander Béla (Hungarian) (May 31, 1857, Késmárk (today Kežmarok, Slovakia) – January 15, 1916, Budapest) was a Hungarian radiologist of Slovak ethnicity, one of the most influential radiologists in the world.

He was the first university lecturer on radiology in the Kingdom of Hungary. Among his many achievements, he described the development of tuberculosis. He was the owner of the first X-ray apparatus in Slovakia and wrote poems in Slovak.

References

1857 births
1916 deaths
People from Kežmarok
Slovak radiologists